The Gran Premio de Madrid is an international horse race which is held in the “Hipódromo de la Zarzuela” racetrack . The race is designated for colts and fillies three years and older. It is a 2,500-metre race.

History
An earlier Gran Premio de Madrid, for 3 year olds over 2500 meters, was instituted in 1881 at the Hipódromo de la Castellana in Madrid. It was first called the Gran Premio de Madrid, changed to the Gran Premio Nacional, and then La Copa de su Majesdad el Rey. The modern-day Gran Premio de Madrid is considered to have been instituted in 1919, first held at Casa Real el Hipódromo de Aranjuez/Legamarejo; it was opened to older horses, and intended as an international race. It was moved to the Hipódromo de la Castellana until that racecourse closed in 1933. In 1933 it returned to its original venue at Aranjuez, and in 1934-35 was run at San Sebastián. In 1941 it was moved to the new Hipódromo de la Zarzuela. La Zarzuela went bankrupt in 1994, and the race was not held until new management re-opened the course in 2006. In 2006, after a 13-year hiatus, a 2,400-metre Gran Premio de Madrid was run, and the new weight conditions were 59.5 kilograms for 4 years and older and 52 kilograms for 3 years of age.

Distances:
1919 - 1921: 1-9/16 miles (2500 meters, 12.5 furlongs)
1922 - 1923: 1-1/2 miles (2400 meters, 12 furlongs)
1924 - 1993: 1-9/16 miles (2500 meters, 12.5 furlongs)
2006 - 2008: 1-1/2 miles (2400 meters, 12 furlongs)
2009–Present: 1-9/16 miles (2500 meters, 12.5 furlongs)

Race day
On the last Sunday in June.

History
The winner of the first edition of the Gran premio de Madrid, in 1919, was the French thoroughbred Nouvel An (son of also French stallion Jacobi.

Winners

References
 Winners, in: Thoroughbred Heritage
 Thoroughbred database

References
Racing Post:

Open middle distance horse races
Horse races in Spain